The 2021 CONMEBOL Recopa Sudamericana was the 29th edition of the CONMEBOL Recopa Sudamericana (also referred to as the Recopa Sudamericana), the football competition organized by CONMEBOL between the winners of the previous season's two major South American club tournaments, the Copa Libertadores and the Copa Sudamericana.

The competition was contested in two-legged home-and-away format between Brazilian team Palmeiras, the 2020 Copa Libertadores champions, and Argentine team Defensa y Justicia, the 2020 Copa Sudamericana champions. The first leg was hosted by Defensa y Justicia on 7 April 2021, while the second leg was hosted by Palmeiras on 14 April 2021. The matches were originally scheduled for 10 February 2021 and 3 March 2021, but were rescheduled due to the participation of Palmeiras in the 2020 FIFA Club World Cup.

Defensa y Justicia defeated Palmeiras 4-3 on penalties after tied 3-3 on aggregate to win their first Recopa Sudamericana.

Teams

Format
The Recopa Sudamericana was played on a home-and-away two-legged basis, with the Copa Libertadores champions hosting the second leg. If tied on aggregate, the away goals rule would not be used, and 30 minutes of extra time would be played. If still tied after extra time, the penalty shoot-out would be used to determine the winners (Regulations Article 17).

Matches

First leg

Second leg
Unsain (Defensa y Justicia) saved a penalty by Gómez (Palmeiras) in the 99th minute of extra time.

Notes

See also
2020 Copa Libertadores Final
2020 Copa Sudamericana Final

References

External links
CONMEBOL Recopa 2021, CONMEBOL

2021
2021 in South American football
2021 in Brazilian football
2021 in Argentine football
April 2021 sports events in South America
Defensa y Justicia matches
Sociedade Esportiva Palmeiras matches